GUF1 homolog, GTPase is a protein that in humans is encoded by the GUF1 gene.
 It is the mitochondrial homolog of elongation factor 4.

References

Further reading